Trismelasmos arfakensis is a moth in the family Cossidae. It was described by Yakovlev in 2011. It is found in New Guinea, where it has been recorded from Irian Jaya.

References

Zeuzerinae
Moths described in 2011